C. tetragona may refer to:
 Cassiope tetragona, the Arctic bell-heather, a plant species
 Clidemia tetragona, a species in the genus Clidemia
 Crassula tetragona, a succulent plant species native to Southern Africa

See also
 Tetragona